Private Eye is an American crime drama television series created by Anthony Yerkovich that aired on NBC from September 13, 1987 until January 8, 1988.

Premise
The series is about an ex-cop (Michael Woods) in 1950s L.A. He works as private eye. When he is hunting the murderer of his brother he meets a young rockabilly street hustler (Josh Brolin) who will help him and eventually becomes his pal. A secretary (Lisa Jane Persky) will join the team.

Cast
Michael Woods as Jack Cleary
Josh Brolin as Johnny Betts
Bill Sadler as Lt. Charlie Fontana
Lisa Jane Persky as Dottie Dworski

Episodes

References

External links

1987 American television series debuts
1988 American television series endings
1980s American crime drama television series
1980s American mystery television series
American detective television series
English-language television shows
NBC original programming
Television series by Universal Television
Television series set in the 1950s
Television shows set in Los Angeles